Jennifer Pringle (born 1983, in York) is an English television presenter and actress.

Pringle is a continuity presenter on Milkshake!, the early-morning programming block for young children, and formerly on Shake!, the weekend morning block for older children, on Channel 5. Pringle joined Milkshake! in July 2006. She joined Shake on 4 October 2009.
Pringle also voices characters in the television shows Angelina Ballerina, Ben and Holly's Little Kingdom EastEnders E20 and Peppa Pig. 
Pringle is best known for being a bit bonkers and enthusiastic, especially on live TV.

Pringle was born in York, and grew up in Scunthorpe. She attended Salford University, studying media and performance.

Filmography

References

1983 births
Living people
Actresses from York
Alumni of the University of Salford